Public transport in Santa Coloma de Gramenet (Catalonia, Spain) is an important part of the Metropolitan Area of Barcelona transportation network. Santa Coloma is a densely populated suburb of the city of Barcelona which fulfills both the role of dormitory town and one of the biggest settlements in the capital's urban area, at around 120,000 inhabitants, and is straddled by Barcelona's Nou Barris and Sant Andreu districts, Badalona, Sant Adrià de Besòs and Montcada i Reixac. The town still relies mostly on bus lines for transportation, but essential improvement arrived in late 2009 with the partial construction of Barcelona Metro line L9. In the future, Generalitat de Catalunya will construct a new line of Tram.

Barcelona Metro stations

Bus lines
Operated by Transports Metropolitans de Barcelona and Tusgsal:

Transport in the municipalities of Barcelonès
Transport in Barcelona
Transport in L'Hospitalet de Llobregat
Transport in Badalona
Transport in Sant Adrià de Besòs
Transport in Montcada i Reixac

Transport in other Metropolitan Area municipalities
Transport in Cornellà de Llobregat

See also
List of Barcelona Metro stations
Autoritat del Transport Metropolità

External links
Grame.net